Ditrema is a genus of surfperches native to the northwestern Pacific Ocean.

Species
There are currently three recognized species in this genus:
 Ditrema jordani V. Franz, 1910
 Ditrema temminckii Bleeker, 1853
 Ditrema temminckii pacificum Katafuchi & Nakabo, 2007
 Ditrema temminckii temminckii Bleeker, 1853
 Ditrema viride Ōshima, 1940

References

Embiotocidae
Marine fish genera
Taxa named by Coenraad Jacob Temminck
Taxa named by Hermann Schlegel